Jason and the Argonauts, (also known as Jason and the Golden Fleece) is a 2000 American television film directed by Nick Willing and produced by Hallmark Entertainment. It is based on the Greek myth of Jason and the Argonauts.

Plot
The film opens as soldiers invade the city of Iolcus. King Aeson's brother Pelias is leading the charge. Inside the temple he goes to embrace his brother but produces a dagger and kills him during the embrace. This is witnessed by his wife Polymele and his son Jason. He intends to do the same to Jason but one of the guards rescues him and takes him out of the palace through a secret tunnel.

It is then revealed that this is a memory, experienced as a nightmare by an older Jason, who  awakes. He is then ordered by his uncle to retrieve the golden fleece.

He recruits a crew from the simple folk of Iolcus, including shepherds and farmers. He is joined by Hercules, Orpheus, Atalanta and the brothers Castor and Pollux. Acastus stows away on the ship, the Argo. The Argonauts run aground on a strange island in the middle of the ocean that is actually the sea god Poseidon. In the ensuing storm, they lose the map. The crew make their way to the Isle of Lemnos, an island of warrior women, to recover from the experience and repair the ship. The men pleasure themselves with the women while their ship is repaired (except Orpheus and Atalanta) and Jason sleeps with the queen Hypsipyle. Atalanta discovers that the women have killed all the men on the island and are planning to sacrifice the crew. She warns Jason, and the Argonauts flee the island.

The crew become rebellious and Jason has Zetes, a young man with brilliant vision, see the stars and find their route to Tabletop Island, where they find Phineus. They are attacked by the Harpies - the winged monsters that torment Phineus - and kill them. In return, Phineus tells them the Golden Fleece is in Colchis. Meanwhile, on Colchis, the princess Medea has visions of the crew and her brother Aspyrtes goes out to find them. Jason finds the ship wrecked and rescues Aspyrtes. They approach the "Dark Rocks" and send a dove through before sailing through themselves.

The Argo docks at Colchis and Jason goes ashore with Aspyrtes, Castor and Pollux. Hera asks Eros to shoot Medea so she falls in love with Jason. King Aertes wants Jason killed but Medea convinces him to face the Bulls of Colchis (sometimes called the Menaian Bull). Medea gives Jason magic oil that protects Jason from the bull's fiery-breath. Jason yokes the bull and ploughs a field and sows it with dragon's teeth. Warriors sprout up from the earth, and Jason tricks them into attacking each other. Medea tells Jason she must go with the Fleece. Aspyrtes overhears this and sends soldiers out after them.

The other Argonauts debate whether to leave or not. Hercules, Orpheus and Argos sail the ship around the island to make it seem as if they have left while the others hide in the water and then join Jason and Medea. When the soldiers attack, Medea kills her brother and leads them to the Fleece which is guarded by a dragon. Some Argonauts are killed before Jason sets a noose around the dragon's neck and makes it fall off a precipice. They take the Fleece and sail away from Colchis.

Acastus has been wounded and Medea uses magic to heal him. Atalanta confesses she loves Jason but he says he will marry Medea. She has a vision of her father's death and the two kiss. Zeus attempts to seduce Medea but she says she loves Jason, even when he pulls out Eros's arrow. The ship arrives back in Iolcus and Jason learns his mother killed herself, believing him and Acastus to be dead. They rest in the bay and Acastus steals the Fleece and goes into town. Pelias kills him and takes the Fleece. Medea then goes and says he will marry her. Jason and the others sneak into the palace through the secret tunnel. Argos is killed by one of the guards. Pelias tries to kill Jason but is stabbed by his own knife.

To cremate the dead Argos, his corpse is burned with the Argo. Then Jason marries Medea and they live as King and Queen of Iolcus.

Cast

Jason London as Jason
Frank Langella as King Aeëtes
Natasha Henstridge as Hypsipyle
Derek Jacobi as Phineus
Olivia Williams as Hera
Angus Macfadyen as Zeus
Dennis Hopper as Pelias
Jolene Blalock as Medea
James Callis as Aspyrtes
Brian Thompson as Hercules
Adrian Lester as Orpheus
Ciarán Hinds as King Aeson
Diana Kent as Polymele
David Calder as Argos
Mark Lewis Jones as Mopsus
Hugh Quarshie as Chiron (the Centaur)
Olga Sosnovska as Atalanta
Kieran O'Brien as Actor
Tom Harper as Acastus
Omid Djalili as Castor
John Sharian as Pollux
Rhys Miles Thomas as Zetes, son of Idas
Mark Folan Deasy as Iphicles
Elliot Levey as Canthus
Xavier Anderson as Phanos
Charles Cartmell as Laertes, father of Odysseus
Dodger Phillips as Tiphys, helmsman
Peter Gevisser as Butes
Norman Roberts as Echion
Greg Hicks as Priest
Adam Cooper as Eros
Mickey Churchill (as Micky Churchill) as Boy Jason
John Bennett as Idas, the mapmaker
Andrew Tansey as Aeëtes' 1st General
Richard Bonehill as Aeëtes' 2nd General
Freda Dowie as Hera as Old Peasant Woman
Zeta Graff as Hypsipyle's 1st General
Zoë Eeles (as Zoe Eeles) as Actor's Lemnite Girl
Alit Kreiz as High Priestess
Andrew Scarborough as Aeson's Soldier
Alan Stocks as Pelias' Bodyguard
Suzanne Harbison as Mopsus' Lemnite Girl
Freya Archard (uncredited) as Zetes' Lemnite Girl
Joseph Gatt (uncredited) as Atlas
Mike Savva (uncredited) as Pelias' Bodyguard

Soundtrack
In 2010, Perseverance Records released the soundtrack album with music by Simon Boswell.

See also
 List of historical drama films
 Greek mythology in popular culture
 Jason and the Argonauts (1963 film)

References

External links

2000 films
2000 fantasy films
2000 television films
2000s American films
American fantasy adventure films
American television films
Films about the Argonauts
Films directed by Nick Willing
Films scored by Simon Boswell
Iolcus in fiction
Sonar Entertainment miniseries
Works about Medea